The Tornado outbreak of September 24, 2001 was one of the worst tornado events to directly affect the Baltimore-Washington metropolitan area in the United States.  The outbreak occurred on Monday, September 24, 2001, and was responsible for two deaths and 57 injuries.

Meteorological synopsis 
On September 24, 2001, a trough in the mid- to upper-levels of the troposphere was tracking across the eastern U.S., accompanied by a cold front sweeping across the Appalachian Mountains. The Storm Prediction Center (SPC) predicted that atmospheric instability ahead of the front would be sufficient to support the development of thunderstorms during the day. Additionally, the anticipated storms were expected to emerge within an area of 45–55 kt (50–65 mph; 85–100 km/h) wind shear, suggesting that development of supercells was possible; these environmental characteristics were also similar to other severe weather events in the Mid-Atlantic. Considering these factors, the SPC  assessed a slight risk of severe weather for parts of the Mid-Atlantic states on September 24. By 12:00 UTC (8:00 a.m. EDT), moisture had moved northwards ahead of the approaching cold front across the East Coast, with dew points exceeding  as far north as Maryland. Towards the late morning, a small low-pressure area emerged over western North Carolina, producing a small area of higher wind shear and resulting in a locally enhanced threat for severe weather along its trajectory towards the northeast. Weather radar detected weak rotation within thunderstorms forming over central North Carolina between 16:30–17:00 UTC. In response to the development of these storms and the favorable conditions afforded by the approaching low-pressure area, the SPC issued a tornado watch for parts of Maryland, Virginia, West Virginia, and the District of Columbia at 17:19 UTC. A thunderstorm formed near Charlottesville, Virginia, following the watch's issuance, while another thunderstorm formed southwest of Fredericksburg, Virginia, around 19:00 UTC. These two storms became supercell thunderstorms as they tracked northeast along with the low-pressure area, producing several tornadoes including an F4 tornado in Culpeper County, Virginia, and an F3 tornado that moved across College Park, Maryland.

Component storms
The first tornado of the outbreak was also the strongest – an F4 (see Fujita scale) tornado that left a 10-mile-long damage path through rural Culpeper and Fauquier Counties in Virginia.  Weak (F1) tornadoes east of Warrenton, and just west of Dulles International Airport soon followed.

A second supercell to the southeast spawned the family of tornadoes that moved through Washington.  A first tornado (F0) was confirmed in the Quantico, and nearby Prince William Forest Park areas; this was soon followed by an F1 tornado that left a 15-mile-long path parallel to I-95 and I-395 through Franconia, western Alexandria, and southeastern Arlington.  This tornado dissipated near the west end of the National Mall in Washington, D.C., and was followed by many reports of funnel clouds. The storm affected workers at the Pentagon who were mending the damage from the September 11 terrorist attacks.

The same storm soon produced a powerful, multiple-vortex F3 tornado in College Park, Maryland.  This storm moved at peak intensity through the University of Maryland, College Park campus, and then moved parallel to I-95 through the Beltsville, Maryland, area, where the tornado caused extensive damage to greenhouses and other facilities of the USDA Beltsville Agricultural Research Center. The storm continued on to Laurel, Maryland, where F3 damage was also noted.  The damage path from this storm was measured at 17.5 miles in length, and this tornado caused two deaths and 55 injuries, along with $101 million in property damage.

The two deaths at College Park were Colleen and Erin Marlatt, who died when their car was picked up by the tornado near the Easton Hall dormitory and thrown into a tree in a parking area.

Confirmed tornadoes

See also
 List of North American tornadoes and tornado outbreaks
 List of District of Columbia tornadoes
 Tornadoes of 2001

References

External links
September 24, 2001 Tornadoes (NWS Baltimore/Washington)
Video of College Park tornado on YouTube

F4 tornadoes by date
Tornadoes of 2001
Tornadoes in Maryland
Tornadoes in Virginia
Tornadoes in Washington, D.C., by date
Maryland, Virginia, And Washington, Dc Tornado Outbreak, 2001
Tornado outbreak